Piero Umiliani (17 July 1926 – 14 February 2001) was an Italian composer of film scores.

Biography

Umiliani was born in Florence, Tuscany. Like many of his Italian colleagues at that time, he composed the scores for many exploitation films in the 1960s and 1970s, covering genres such as Spaghetti Westerns, Eurospy, Giallo, and softcore sex films.

His composition "Mah Nà Mah Nà" (1968) was originally used in Sweden: Heaven and Hell, a 1968 Mondo documentary about Sweden. It was a minor charting single (spending 6 weeks on the Billboard chart and peaking at #55, and reaching #22 in Canada), popularized by The Red Skelton Show, first airing in October 1969, and The Muppets, who covered the song several times; starting on episode 0014 of Sesame Street on 27 November 1969, then The Ed Sullivan Show three days later, and again on the syndicated series The Muppet Show in 1977. The track was also a hit in the UK, reaching number 8 in the UK Singles Chart in May 1977.

Umiliani's other scores included Son of Django, Orgasmo, Gangster's Law, Death Knocks Twice, Five Dolls for an August Moon, Baba Yaga, The Slave and Sex Pot. His orchestra score "Arrivano I Marines" for War Italian Style, a 1966 comedy about two USMC soldiers in Italy, is used in the Armored Trooper Votoms series as "March of the Red Shoulders".

His composition "Crepuscolo Sul Mare" was later used in Ocean's Twelve. More recently, his composition Echi Della Natura featured on the soundtrack of Ashim Ahluwalia’s 2012 film, Miss Lovely.

Umiliani died in Rome in February 2001, at the age of 74.

Selected filmography

References

External links
 
 
 Official Website

1926 births
2001 deaths
Musicians from Florence
Italian film score composers
Italian male film score composers
20th-century Italian musicians
20th-century Italian male musicians